Westminster was a provincial electoral district in the Canadian province of British Columbia. It appeared in the 1890 election only.  In 1894 it was succeeded by Westminster-Chilliwhack, Westminster-Delta, Westminster-Dewdney, and Westminster-Richmond, which were in the 1898 election succeeded by ridings named similarly, but without the "Westminster".

Note that this provincial riding should not be confused with the federal Westminster District riding which appeared only in the 1917 election, and which was succeeded by the Fraser Valley riding.

Political geography and history 

In the early 1880s the Lower Fraser Valley south and east of the city of New Westminster was largely unpopulated, with voters there voting in one of the two New Westminster ridings (New Westminster or New Westminster City). With the opening of the Canadian Pacific Railway settlement of the lush Fraser Valley lands was rapid, and a new more rural riding - Westminster - was created spanning the entire lower Fraser from Richmond to Chilliwack.  Increasing growth led to the riding's further subdivision for the 1894 election into four sub-ridings, Westminster-Chilliwhack, Westminster-Delta, Westminster-Dewdney and Westminster-Richmond.  The successor ridings dropped the Westminster-prefix for the 1903 election.

The name Westminster in the riding's name derives not so much from these areas being dependent on the city of New Westminster, but because it and all its successor ridings are all in the New Westminster Land District (beyond Chilliwack is the Yale Land District).

Electoral history 
Note: winners in each election are highlighted bold. 

|Independent
|Arthur Herring
|align="right"|81
|align="right"|2.83%
|align="right"|
|align="right"|unknown

{{CANelec |BC |Opposition |Thomas Edwin Kitchen |503 	 |17.55% |– |unknown}}

|Independent
|James Punch 
|align="right"|484 	
|align="right"|'''16.89%
|align="right"|
|align="right"|unknown

|Independent
|Colin Buchanan Sword
|align="right"|461 		
|align="right"|16.08%
|align="right"|
|align="right"|unknown
|- bgcolor="white"
!align="right" colspan=3|Total valid votes
!align="right"|2,866
!align="right"|100.00%
!align="right"|
|- bgcolor="white"
!align="right" colspan=3|Total rejected ballots
!align="right"|
!align="right"|
!align="right"|
|- bgcolor="white"
!align="right" colspan=3|Turnout
!align="right"|%
!align="right"|
!align="right"|
|}
1 Incumbent Premier of BC

Former provincial electoral districts of British Columbia
New Westminster